Phil Stanford is an American journalist and author based in Oregon. He is best known for his work on the 1989 murder of Oregon Department of Corrections director Michael Francke and his efforts to prove the innocence of Frank Gable, who was wrongfully convicted of the crime. His 1994 Oregonian series on the “Happy Face Killer” case resulted in two innocent people being released from prison.

He is the author of Portland Confidential and three other books, as well as the lead writer and executive producer of the hit podcast series "Murder in Oregon: Who Killed Michael Francke?"

Career

The Oregonian 
From 1987 to 1994, Stanford wrote a column for the Oregonian which covered crime and local politics. Despite the popularity of the column and the success of the "Happy Face Killer" series, disagreements with management over his coverage of the Francke murder led Stanford to quit the paper in 1994. Stanford continued to write about the Francke case and police corruption in his column for the Portland Tribune, which ran from 2001 to 2008. Before moving to Oregon, Stanford worked as a magazine writer and editor in Washington, D.C. and San Francisco. He has written for a number of publications including The New York Times Magazine, The Washingtonian, Parade, Columbia Journalism Review, and Rolling Stone.

Books 
Stanford's first book, Portland Confidential, which won the Independent Publisher's “Best True Crime Award” for 2005, was described by one reviewer as “an entertaining trip back to a film noir incarnation of the Rose City”.  The Peyton-Allan Files, about the 1960 lovers’ lane slaying of two Portland teenagers, purports to solve the most sensational murder in Portland history.  White House Call Girl, Stanford's only departure from Portland subject matter, presents a different perspective on the infamous 1972 Watergate break-in. His book Rose City Vice deals with a 1970s vice cop scandal and subsequent official cover-up. Other publications include a collection of his columns from the Oregonian entitled Do You Know How Much a Light Year Is?  and a graphic novel City of Roses with artist Patric Reynolds.

Podcasts 
Stanford worked with iHeartRadio podcasts to produce the 12 part series "Murder in Oregon: Who Killed Michael Francke?," which climbed to #4 on the Amazon podcast charts.

Works

Books 
 Do You Know How Much a Light Year Is? Touchstone Press (1991).
 Portland Confidential: Sex, Crime, and Corruption in the Rose City. Westwinds (2004).
 The Peyton-Allan Files. Ptown Books (2010).
 White House Call Girl. Port Townsend, Wash.: Feral House (2013).
 Evidence Package.
 City of Roses: Crime Does Not Pay, with Patric Reynolds. Milwaukee, Ore.: Dark Horse Comics (2014).
 Rose City Vice: Portland in the '70s—Dirty Cops and Dirty Robbers. Port Townsend, Wash.: Feral House (2017).

Articles 
 "The Charge of the White Horse Brigade." Inquiry, (Oct. 29, 1979), pp. 6–7.
 "Watergate Revisited." Columbia Journalism Review (Mar./Apr. 1986).

References

External links
 Appearance on C-SPAN
 Letter (Aug. 13, 2013) to Adam Parfrey from John W. Dean
 A Murder in Oregon with Phil Stanford at Gold Beach Rotary Club (Mar. 6, 2020)

American non-fiction writers
Living people
Journalists from Portland, Oregon
Writers from Oregon
The Oregonian people
Year of birth missing (living people)